A farm is an area of land or water that is primarily devoted to agricultural or aquacultural processes.

Farm may also refer to:

Geography
 Farm Lake, a lake in the U.S. state of Minnesota

Types of farms
 Dairy farm, a facility for long-term production of milk
 Prison farm, a facility where prisoners perform hard labor
 Truck farm (or market garden), the relatively small-scale production of produce and flowers as cash crops, frequently sold directly to consumers and restaurants
 Wind farm, for the production of electricity by means of turbines
 Solar farm, is a large-scale photovoltaic power system (PV system) designed for the supply of  power. 
 Antenna farm, in telecom circles, any single area with more than three antennas could be referred to as an antenna farm.

Arts, entertainment, and media
Farm (album), an album by the alternative rock band Dinosaur Jr.
 Ant farm, a toy to see living ants in
 Farming, a strategy for acquiring resources in a video game; see: Gold farming

Computing and technology
 Server farm, a clustered group of computer servers
 Compile farm, a group of computers used for compiling computer programs
 Link farm, a website designed to spoof search engine indexers
 Render farm, a clustered group of computers used for 3D rendering
 Wiki farm, a server farm hosting a wiki

Other uses
 Farm (revenue leasing), "farming out" a tax or rent or other revenue, for a governing power to lease to someone the right to collect that revenue
 Farm Sanctuary, an organization which cares for rescued farm animals
Farm Animal Rights Movement (FARM), an animal rights organization
 Farm team, a team providing experience and training for young players

See also
 Farmer (disambiguation)
 Farming (disambiguation)
 Foundation for Ancient Research and Mormon Studies (FARMS)
 State farm (disambiguation)
 The Farm (disambiguation)